The College Women's Club was a women's club founded in 1920 based in Berkeley, California. It organized Berkeley's first cooperative day nursery and established scholarships.

The building
The College Women's Club building was built by Walter T. Steilberg in 1928 in the American Craftsman style.

The College Women's Club sold the building and it was turned into a rooming house and a sorority. The building was restored in the early 1990s and then became the Berkeley Hotel.

The building, now the Berkeley Hotel, was designated a "City of Berkeley Landmark" in 1979 and was listed on the National Register of Historic Places in 1982.

References

Women's clubs in the United States
Women's organizations based in the United States
Clubhouses on the National Register of Historic Places in California
American Craftsman architecture in California
Women's club buildings in California
History of women in California